The following are the Pulitzer Prizes for 1964.

Journalism awards

Public Service:
The St. Petersburg Times, for its aggressive investigation of the Florida Turnpike Authority which disclosed widespread illegal acts and resulted in a major reorganization of the State's road construction program.
Local General or Spot News Reporting:
Norman C. Miller, of The Wall Street Journal, for his comprehensive account of a multimillion-dollar vegetable oil swindle in New Jersey.
Local Investigative Specialized Reporting:
James V. Magee and Albert V. Gaudiosi, reporters and Frederick Meyer, photographer of the Philadelphia Bulletin, for their expose of numbers racket operations with police collusion in South Philadelphia, which resulted in arrests and a cleanup of the police department.
National Reporting:
 Merriman Smith of United Press International, for his outstanding coverage of the assassination of President John F. Kennedy.
International Reporting:
 Malcolm W. Browne and David Halberstam of the Associated Press and The New York Times, for their individual reporting of the Vietnam war and the overthrow of the Diem regime.
Editorial Writing:
 Hazel Brannon Smith of the Lexington Advertiser, for steadfast adherence to her editorial duty in the face of great pressure and opposition.
Editorial Cartooning:
 Paul Conrad of The Denver Post, for his editorial cartooning during the past year

Photography:
 Robert H. Jackson of the Dallas Times Herald, for his photograph of the murder of Lee Harvey Oswald by Jack Ruby.
Special Citation:
 Gannett Newspapers, for their program, "The Road To Integration", a distinguished example of the use of a newspaper group's resources to complement the work of its individual newspapers.

Letters, Drama and Music Awards

Fiction:
 No award given.
Drama:
 No award given.
History:
 Puritan Village: The Formation of a New England Town by Sumner Chilton Powell (Wesleyan University Press).
Biography or Autobiography:
 John Keats by Walter Jackson Bate (Harvard University Press).
Poetry:
 At The End Of The Open Road by Louis Simpson (Wesleyan University Press).
General Non-Fiction:
 Anti-intellectualism in American Life by Richard Hofstadter (Random).
Music:
 No award given.

References

External links
Pulitzer Prizes for 1964

Pulitzer Prizes by year
Pulitzer Prize
Pulitzer Prize
Pulitzer Prize